Sanchai Namkhet (Thai: สัญชัย นามเขต) is a Thai long-distance runner.

Personal bests
Outdoor
3000m - 8:36.90 (Chonburi 2013)
5000m - 14:40.59 (Singapore 2015)
10,000m - 30:35.54 (Naypiydaw 2013)
3000m steeplechase - 9:25.66 (Vientiane 2012)
Half Marathon - 1:08:41 (Buriram 2017)
Marathon - 2:34:39 (Samui Island 2012)

Indoor
3000m - 8:36.95 (Ashgabat 2017)

References

http://www.all-athletics.com/athlete/354872

Living people
Sanchai Namkhet
Southeast Asian Games medalists in athletics
1989 births
Sanchai Namkhet
Athletes (track and field) at the 2018 Asian Games
Competitors at the 2015 Southeast Asian Games
Competitors at the 2017 Southeast Asian Games
Sanchai Namkhet
Sanchai Namkhet
Sanchai Namkhet